The Book of Mormon, a work of scripture of the Latter Day Saint movement, describes itself as having a portion originally written in reformed Egyptian characters on plates of metal or "ore" by prophets living in the Western Hemisphere from perhaps as early as the 6th century BC until as late as the 5th century AD. Joseph Smith, the movement's founder, published the Book of Mormon in 1830 as a translation of these golden plates. Smith said that after he finished the translation, he returned the golden plates to the angel Moroni.

Scholarly reference works on languages do not acknowledge the existence of either a "reformed Egyptian" language or "reformed Egyptian" script as it was described by Joseph Smith. No archaeological, linguistic, or other evidence of the use of Egyptian writing in the ancient Americas exists.

Reformed Egyptian and the Book of Mormon
The Book of Mormon uses the term "reformed Egyptian" in only one verse, which says that "the characters which are called among us the reformed Egyptian, [were] handed down and altered by us, according to our manner of speech" and that "none other people knoweth our language." The book also says that its first author, Nephi, used the "learning of the Jews and the language of the Egyptians" to write his record which constitutes the first two books of the Book of Mormon. The abridgment that the Book of Mormon says was prepared by Mormon and Moroni nearly a thousand years later in approximately 380 AD, containing most of the balance of the book, was written in "reformed Egyptian" because it took less space than Hebrew, which had also been altered after the people left Jerusalem.

Mormon scholars note that other scripts were developed to write Egyptian through the centuries and have hypothesized that the term "reformed Egyptian" refers to a form of Egyptian writing similar to other modified Egyptian scripts such as hieratic, a handwritten form of hieroglyphics thousands of years old by the first millennium BC, or early Demotic, a simplified derivative of hieratic, which was used in northern Egypt fifty years before the time that the Book of Mormon states that prophet-patriarch Lehi left Jerusalem for the Americas. The archaeological record includes occasional use in the Land of Israel, known as Palestinian Hieratic, mostly of isolated hieratic symbols, dating from the 8th through early 6th centuries BC.

Although accounts of the process differ, Smith is said to have translated the reformed Egyptian characters engraved on gold plates into English through various means, including the use of a seer stone or the interpreter stones, or both. Smith said when he had finished the translation, he returned the plates to the angel Moroni, and therefore they are unavailable for study.

The "Anthon Transcript"

The "Anthon Transcript" is a piece of paper on which Joseph Smith is said to have transcribed reformed Egyptian characters from the golden plates—the ancient record from which Smith claimed to have translated the Book of Mormon. A manuscript known as the "Caractors" document was previously thought to be this transcript. However, handwriting analysis has suggested that this document was written by John Whitmer, one of the Eight Witnesses. Since the actual Anthon Transcript was taken to New York in the winter of 1828, and John Whitmer was not affiliated with the Church until June 1829, the "Caractors" document cannot be the Anthon Transcript.

Smith said that when this sample was presented by Smith's colleague Martin Harris to Columbia College professor Charles Anthon, a noted classical scholar, that Anthon had attested to the characters' authenticity in writing but had then ripped up his certification after hearing that the plates had been revealed by an angel. Anthon wrote, to the contrary, that he had believed from the first that Harris was the victim of fraud.

In 1844, Church of Jesus Christ of Latter Day Saints published a broadside about the Book of Mormon called "The Stick of Joseph" that reprinted some "reformed Egyptian" characters that resemble those on the first three lines of the "Caractors" document. The broadside said that the characters were those that had been shown to Anthon. But it is unlikely that the characters on the broadside came directly from the "Caractors" document because Whitmer was excommunicated in 1838 and took his papers with him.

Mainstream scholarly view of reformed Egyptian
Standard language reference works contain no reference to "reformed Egyptian". No non-Mormon scholars acknowledge the existence of either a "reformed Egyptian" language or a "reformed Egyptian" script as it has been described in Mormon belief. For instance, in 1966, John A. Wilson, professor of Egyptology at the University of Chicago, wrote, "From time to time there are allegations that picture writing has been found in America . ... In no case has a professional Egyptologist been able to recognize these characters as Egyptian hieroglyphs. From our standpoint there is no such language as 'reformed Egyptian'." Anthropologist Michael D. Coe of Yale University, an expert in pre-Columbian Mesoamerican studies, wrote, "Of all the peoples of the pre-Columbian New World, only the ancient Maya had a complete script."  Fifteen examples of distinct writing systems have been identified in pre-Columbian Mesoamerica, many from a single inscription.

Mormon studies of reformed Egyptian

Mormon studies of reformed Egyptian are necessarily limited to whatever linguistic evidence can be obtained from the text of the Book of Mormon plus the extant seven-line "Caractors" document that may or may not be the symbols said to have been copied from the gold plates. Four Mormon non-linguist translators with varying levels of education have attempted to decipher the "Caractors" document. According to Brigham Young University Egyptologist John Gee, "the corpus is not large enough to render decipherment feasible."

Terryl Givens has suggested that the characters are early examples of Egyptian symbols being used "to transliterate Hebrew words and vice versa," that Demotic is a "reformed Egyptian", and that the mixing of a Semitic language with modified Egyptian characters is demonstrated in inscriptions of ancient Syria and the Land of Israel. Other Mormon apologists have suggested that the characters resemble those of shorthand for various languages including Hebrew, Demotic (Egyptian), Hieratic (Egyptian), Coptic (Egyptian), Mayan/Olmec, and Irish ogham ciphers. Hugh Nibley argued that a "revealed text in English" is preferable to trying to understand the original language.

Mormon scholar David Bokovoy asserts that because the word "reformed" in the Book of Mormon text is not capitalized, it should not be seen as part of the title of the language, but an adjective describing the type of Egyptian that Nephi used. "According to this definition" Bokovoy argues, "archaeologists have uncovered important examples of reformed Egyptian, including hieratic and Demotic. In addition, he references a verse in which Moroni states that the initial writing had been changed over the years:

And now, behold, we have written this record according to our knowledge, in the characters which are called among us the reformed Egyptian, being handed down and altered by us, according to our manner of speech . ... But the Lord knoweth the things which we have written, and also that none other people knoweth our language; and because that none other people knoweth our language, therefore he hath prepared means for the interpretation thereof.

See also

Anthon Transcript forgery
Egyptian language
Book of Abraham

Notes and references

External links
John Gee, Some Notes on the Anthon Transcript, Mormon apologetics.
William J. Hamblin, Reformed Egyptian, Mormon apologetics.
Richard G. Grant, Reformed Egyptian: 'In the Language of My Fathers', Mormon apologetics.
Jerald and Sandra Tanner, A book excerpt critical of Book of Mormon archeology
Martin Harris testimony in "Times and Seasons".
Summary of skeptical material about the Anthon Transcript from Utah Lighthouse Ministries.

Book of Mormon studies
Language and mysticism
Book of Mormon words and phrases
Spurious languages
Seership in Mormonism